Sunlight Mountain Resort and Ski Area is a ski area in Colorado, located in Garfield County in the White River National Forest, south of nearby Glenwood Springs.

About
The ski area caters to local skiers and large groups. The area has three chairlifts and a vertical drop exceeding . Operations began in December 1966 with one chairlift and a second was added in 1973.

Terrain
The resort has surprising variety of terrain for its size, encompassing easy beginner runs, cruiser runs, as well as a section of steep chutes. The area covers a northeast-facing below-tree line basin that funnels all runs toward a single base area. Sunlight's summit offers views of Mount Sopris and the Elk Mountains.

U.S. Ski Team
Alice McKennis (b. 1989), World Cup racer in speed events. Two-time Olympian from New Castle, Colo., who learned to ski at Sunlight at the age of two. McKennis placed fifth in the Women's Downhill in 2018 Winter Olympics. On March 31, 2018, Sunlight dedicated Aligator Alleys, a series of three steep chutes on its famed East Ridge, in honor of McKennis, whose Instagram profile name is @thealigator.

References

External links

Buildings and structures in Garfield County, Colorado
Ski areas and resorts in Colorado
Tourist attractions in Garfield County, Colorado
White River National Forest